Alarda Catharina Mol (born 20 January 1982) is a former Dutch international cricketer whose career for the Dutch national side spanned from 2009 to 2011.

Born in The Hague, Mol made both her One Day International (ODI) and Twenty20 International debuts for the Netherlands in August 2009, against Ireland. Her only other appearances in those formats came in a four-team tournament played in Colombo, Sri Lanka, in April 2011. Mol had little success in her international career, averaging under five runs per innings in both ODIs and Twenty20 Internationals.

See also
 List of Netherlands women ODI cricketers
 List of Netherlands women Twenty20 International cricketers

References

1982 births
Dutch women cricketers
Living people
Netherlands women One Day International cricketers
Netherlands women Twenty20 International cricketers
Sportspeople from The Hague
20th-century Dutch women
21st-century Dutch women